José Manuel Álvarez (10 June 1910 – 8 June 1991) was a Mexican sprinter who competed in the 1932 Summer Olympics in the 400m and 4 x 400m relay. He won gold and silver medals at the Central American and Caribbean Games.

References

External links
 

1910 births
1991 deaths
Mexican male sprinters
Olympic athletes of Mexico
Athletes (track and field) at the 1932 Summer Olympics
Athletes from Mexico City
Competitors at the 1930 Central American and Caribbean Games
Central American and Caribbean Games gold medalists for Mexico
Central American and Caribbean Games medalists in athletics
20th-century Mexican people